The Twin Cedars Community School District is a rural public school district headquartered northwest of Bussey, Iowa.

The district spans eastern Marion County and western Mahaska County. The district serves the towns of Bussey, Hamilton, Marysville, the unincorporated community of Tracy and the surrounding rural areas.

The school's mascot is the Sabers. Their colors are blue and white.

Schools
The district operates two schools on a single campus at 2204 Highway G71 northwest of Bussey:
Twin Cedars Elementary School
Twin Cedars Jr-Sr High School

Twin Cedars High School

Athletics 
The Sabers compete in the Bluegrass Conference, including the following sports:

Volleyball
Cross Country (boys and girls)  
Football (8-man)
Basketball (boys and girls)
Track and Field (boys and girls)
Baseball
 2014 Class 1A State Champions
Softball

Enrollment

See also
List of school districts in Iowa
List of high schools in Iowa

References

External links
 Twin Cedars Community School District

School districts in Iowa
Education in Marion County, Iowa
Education in Mahaska County, Iowa